Dehydrocorybulbine (DHCB) is an alkaloid isolated from Corydalis yanhusuo. Dehydrocorybulbine binds to the dopamine D1 receptor.

Research has indicated that DHCB can be helpful in reducing neuropathic pain.

References

Isoquinoline alkaloids
Heterocyclic compounds with 4 rings
Methoxy compounds